William Hennessy (born September 25, 1872, date of death unknown) was an American wrestler. He competed in three events at the 1904 Summer Olympics.

References

External links
 

1872 births
Year of death missing
American male sport wrestlers
Olympic wrestlers of the United States
Wrestlers at the 1904 Summer Olympics
Sportspeople from Fitchburg, Massachusetts